Renée Belanger (born 12 September 1962) is a Canadian middle-distance runner. She competed in the women's 800 metres at the 1988 Summer Olympics.

References

1962 births
Living people
Athletes (track and field) at the 1986 Commonwealth Games
Commonwealth Games competitors for Canada
Athletes (track and field) at the 1987 Pan American Games
Pan American Games track and field athletes for Canada
Athletes (track and field) at the 1988 Summer Olympics
Canadian female middle-distance runners
Olympic track and field athletes of Canada
Competitors at the 1987 Summer Universiade
Place of birth missing (living people)
Laval Rouge et Or athletes